The Doda River or the Stod River is a river  long, which forms the Stod Valley in the Zanskar valley of the Leh district in the Union Territory of Ladakh.

Geography 
The Doda River rises from the Drang-Drung Glacier near Pensi La, a mountain pass off the Zanskar-Kargil road. The Drang-Drung Glacier is a river of ice and snow by itself and is the largest glacier other than the Siachen Glacier in Ladakh outside the Karakoram Range. After rising from its source, the Doda River flows southeast down along the Kargil — Zanskar road in the main Zanskar valley, through the towns of Akshu, Abran, Kushol and Phey. The river then passes a confluence with its tributary, the Tsarap River, at Padum, the capital of Zanskar. Together, these two rivers form the Zanskar River, a tributary of the Indus River.

The Doda River contributes to the minimal agricultural production of the Zanskar valley by providing irrigation to the fields of barley, wheat, buckwheat and peas. Accessible in the summer, the Pensi La mountain pass at the source of the river receives heavy snowfall along with the other pass Zojila, which cuts off the Stod Valley from the rest of the country during winter, and the river freezes during this season. The Doda River is famous for adventure sports. Rafting events are organised throughout the length of the Doda and the Zanskar.

References 

Rivers of Jammu and Kashmir
Geography of Ladakh
Indus basin
Rivers of India